Skipton Business Finance is a UK factoring and Invoice discounting company, founded and based in Skipton, North Yorkshire. It is a wholly owned subsidiary of Skipton Building Society.

2007 Loan fund to SMEs 
The Telegraph   reported that, in late 2007, Skipton Business Finance had created a £25million credit line, to aide new businesses in the north of England that had at least £2million sales.

2010 EFG Scheme 
Skipton Business Finance was chosen by the UK government to be included as one of the lenders on the Enterprise Finance Guarantee, a UK government guaranteed scheme. It was intended to enable banks to lend to viable small businesses that are unable to provide the security that the bank would otherwise require.

This scheme enables businesses with a turnover of up to £25million to be able to access loans from companies such as Skipton Business Finance, 75% of the loan of which is guaranteed by the UK government.

2012 Record first half year 

The Yorkshire Post reported that Skipton Business Finance had seen a 50% increase in deals over the first six months of 2012, a record for the invoice finance provider.

2013 Expansion 

It was reported in the Derbyshire press that Skipton Business Finance had expanded its reach further into the East Midlands through the recruitment of new staff, following an increase in regional businesses requiring invoice finance.

References

External links 
Skipton Business Finance Link label

Financial services companies of the United Kingdom
Skipton
Companies based in Craven District